Birkan Sokullu (born 6 October 1985) is a Turkish actor.

Life and career 

Birkan Sokullu was born in Istanbul on 6 October 1985. Sokullu's grandparents were Bosnian immigrants. Sokullu left his basketball career after 10 years due to his leg injury. He graduated  from Maltepe University with a specialty in Radio TV Programming. While studying at university, he began his modelling career. He took acting lessons from Dolunay Soysert. He also studied in Drama and Acting Departmant of İstanbul Aydın University for one year. But he left. 

Birkan started to get noticed that  joined as new characters in the popular series including "Küçük Kadınlar", youth series "Melekler Korusun", crime series "Uçurum". His first popular leading role is Demir (original role, Dan) in Küçük Sırlar, the Turkish remake of Gossip Girl. His fame gained with hit series "Hayat Şarkısı" and "Masumlar Apartmanı". His period series are "Kurt Seyit ve Şura", "Rise of Empires: Ottoman", "Ya İstiklal Ya Ölüm", "Bir Aile Hikayesi", "Fatih". He played in vampire series "Yaşamayanlar" with Kerem Bürsin, Elçin Sangu and horror film "Güzelliğin Portresi".

Filmography

External links

References 

1985 births
Living people
Turkish male television actors
Male actors from Istanbul
Turkish people of Bosniak descent
Turkish basketball players